Roi Mata (or Roy Mata, Roymata) was a powerful Melanesian  chief in what is now Vanuatu. He is believed to have lived at the end of the 16th century, or the beginning of the 17th.

In 2008, three sites associated with Roi Mata, on the islands of Efate, Lelepa and Eretoka, were made UNESCO World Heritage Sites.

Roi Mata's grave
Roi Mata's elaborate grave, containing the bodies of over 25 members of his retinue, was discovered by French archaeologist  in 1967 and inscribed on the World Heritage List in 2008. Garanger was able to locate the grave on Eretoka island by analyzing local folklore. According to legend, when Roi Mata conquered the land, his first goal was to unite the tribes to form an army.

His reign is reputed to have been a peaceful one. Roi Mata was fatally poisoned by his brother. His body was not buried in his homeland and his name was not used in future generations because the locals feared his spirit.

Gallery

Notes and references

Notes

References

External links
 Vanuatu A to Z  Retrieved August 25, 2006.
"Roy Mata", Encyclopædia Britannica

History of Vanuatu
Vanuatuan chiefs
Deaths by poisoning
People murdered in Vanuatu
Vanuatuan murder victims
World Heritage Sites in Vanuatu
Year of birth unknown
Year of death unknown
16th-century monarchs